Clete Anthony Kushida (born 1960) is a sleep medicine clinician and sleep scientist, a Professor in the Department of Psychiatry and Behavioral Sciences at the Stanford University Medical Center, medical director of the Stanford Sleep Disorders Clinic, and Director of the Stanford University Center for Human Sleep Research.

Kushida received a doctorate in neurosciences/biopsychology from the University of Chicago in 1986, and a medical degree from the University of Chicago School of Medicine in 1990. In 1994 he completed a residency in neurology at the University of California, San Diego, Medical Center; and in 1996   completed a sleep medicine fellowship at the Stanford University Medical Center. He earned board certification from the American Board of Sleep Medicine in 1996.

He has been secretary-treasurer of the American Board of Sleep Medicine and secretary of the American Sleep Medicine Foundation, and on the medical advisory board of the Restless Legs Syndrome Foundation.  He was elected to the AASM board of directors in 2005 and served as president from 2009 to 2010.  Currently he is the President of the World Sleep Federation and a member of the editorial boards of the journal SLEEP and the Journal of Clinical Sleep Medicine.

He  is the principal investigator of the Apnea Positive Pressure Long-term Efficacy Study (APPLES), a National Heart, Lung, and Blood Institute (NHLBI)-sponsored research project measuring the effectiveness of continuous positive airway pressure (CPAP) therapy for obstructive sleep apnea (OSA). The multi-site study focuses on how CPAP usage affects memory, learning, sleepiness, mood and quality of life. He also directs several other research studies, focusing on topics such as the physical features and neurocognitive changes associated with OSA, the epidemiology and treatment of restless legs syndrome/periodic limb movement disorder, primary care sleep education and training, and countermeasures for sleep loss.

His most cited article, on  polysomnography has been cited 570 times according to Google Scholar.

References

External links

 Stanford profile

1960 births
Living people
American neuroscientists
University of Chicago alumni
Stanford University faculty
Pritzker School of Medicine alumni